The 43rd Telluride Film Festival took place on September 2–5, 2016, in Telluride, Colorado, United States.

Director Volker Schlöndorff was appointed as the year's guest director. Telluride honored Casey Affleck, Amy Adams, and Pablo Larraín as the Silver Medallion awardees. The festival line-up was announced on September 1, 2016.

Official selections

Main program

Guest Director's Selections
The films were selected and presented by the year's guest director, Volker Schlöndorff.

Filmmakers of Tomorrow

Student Prints
The selection was curated and introduced by Gregory Nava. It selected the best student-produced work around the world.

Calling Cards
The selection was curated by Barry Jenkins. It selected new works from promising filmmakers.

Great Expectations
The selection was curated by Barry Jenkins.

Frontlot/Backlot
The selection included behind-the-scene movies and portraits of artists, musicians, and filmmakers.

Silver Medallion
Casey Affleck
Amy Adams
Pablo Larraín

References

External links
 

2016 film festivals
2016 in Colorado
43rd